The Return (Povratak) is a 1979 Croatian film directed by Antun Vrdoljak, starring Boris Dvornik, Fabijan Šovagović and Rade Šerbedžija.

Cast 
 Boris Dvornik - Barba Frane
 Fabijan Šovagović - Barba Pave
 Rade Šerbedžija - Police commander (Zandarski narednik)
 Boris Buzančić - Sjor Berto
 Milena Dravić - Roza
 Dušica Žegarac - Marija, Franina zena
 Vinko Kraljević - Stipica
 Matko Raguz - Grispe
 Renata Jurkovic - Ljuba, mlada partizanka
 Dragan Despot - Niko
 Ante Vican - Policajac

References

External links
 

1979 films
Croatian war drama films
1970s Croatian-language films
Croatian World War II films
War films set in Partisan Yugoslavia